Vallecillo is a municipality in the Honduran department of Francisco Morazán.

Municipalities of the Francisco Morazán Department

Populated Place, Long -87.65, Lat 14.7